Lord Stevens or Baron Stevens may refer to:
David Stevens, Baron Stevens of Ludgate (born 1936)
John Stevens, Baron Stevens of Kirkwhelpington (born 1942)
Simon Stevens, Baron Stevens of Birmingham (born 1966)